Clapham Common is an administrative division of the London Borough of Lambeth, United Kingdom.

Demography 
The ward contains stretches South from Clapham Park Road to the boundary with Wandsworth at Balham Hill. It contains roads such as the A24 Clapham Common Southside and Abbeville Road, along with Lambeth College and Lambeth Academy. Approximately one quarter of the area of ward is taken up with Clapham Common. At the 2011 Census the population of the ward was 12,852.

The ward is located in the Streatham parliamentary constituency.

Ward elections

References

External links
Lambeth Borough Council profile for the ward
Clapham Common ward results on Lambeth website

Wards of the London Borough of Lambeth